Bruce Anstey  (born 21 August 1969 in New Zealand) is a professional motorcycle road racer. He is a former lap record holder on the world-famous Snaefell Mountain Course with a time of 17 minutes 6.682 seconds, at an average speed of  set during the 2014 Superbike TT Race. Anstey was signed to race for the Padgett's Honda Racing Team having previously ridden for TAS Suzuki Racing, Valmoto Triumph and DTR Yamaha. For thirteen consecutive seasons, from 2002 - 2015, Bruce Anstey managed to secure a top three finish at the world's three most prestigious road races; the North West 200, the Isle of Man TT and the Ulster Grand Prix.

A press release issued on behalf of Anstey on 10 April 2018, stated that due to illness he would not compete during the 2018 racing season. He did however ride a parade lap on board a Honda RC213V-S during the 2018 Isle of Man Festival of Motorcycling in late August. Anstey announced a return to competitive racing in July 2019 stating he would compete at the Classic TT, and secured a victory in the 250 cc event. 

In a BBC interview in September 2021, Anstey stated that it his intention to resume racing at the 2022 Classic TT.

Racing career 
Said to have been inspired to take up a career as a motorcycle racer after watching Mike Hailwood's comeback victory at the 1978 Isle of Man TT Races, Anstey made his competitive debut on Boxing Day, 1990, at the Cemetery Circuit, Whanganui in his native New Zealand, competing on a Suzuki RGV250.

Isle of Man TT

Yamaha (1996-2002)

1996
Anstey made his Isle of Man TT debut at the 1996 event. Riding a Yamaha he finished in 29th place in the Lightweight TT before retiring in the Senior TT.

1996 TT results

1998
Due to illness Anstey did not participate at the 1997 TT, with his next appearance being at the 1998 races. Again featuring in the Lightweight and Senior races, Anstey took his Yamaha TZ250 to a 26th-place finish in the Lightweight and followed this by taking 20th in the Senior TT, being the third 250cc mounted rider to finish behind Gavin Lee and his fellow New Zealander, Shaun Harris.

1998 TT results

1999
Campaigning in the same classes as the previous year and riding the same Yamaha TZ250, Anstey's form continued to improve in 1999, with him securing his first top 10 finish by claiming 7th in the Lightweight and following this up with 24th in the Senior.

1999 TT results

2000
The 2000 Isle of Man TT saw Anstey gain his first podium place at the event, finishing second behind Joey Dunlop in the Lightweight TT. The second race of his week saw him again riding the DTR Yamaha TZ250 in the Senior where he took the Denis Trollope machine to the highest place of any 250cc machine in the race, 14th.

2000 TT results

2002
The 2001 Isle of Man TT was cancelled as a precaution against the Foot and Mouth Outbreak reaching the Island. Racing resumed in 2002, with Anstey being entered in five races.
He retired in the week's curtain raiser, the Formula 1 TT, however his fortunes improved as race week progressed. In the Ultra-Lightweight TT Anstey took his DTR 125cc Yamaha to 10th place and then followed this with 3rd place in the Production 1000cc class. He then secured his maiden victory at the TT taking the honours in the Lightweight TT on a DTR 250cc Yamaha. Anstey then recorded a 2nd-place finish in his final race of the week, the Production 600cc.

2002 TT results

Triumph (2003)

2003
At the 2003 meeting, Anstey competed in four categories. Opening his account with the runner up position in the Production 1000cc race, he followed this up with a victory in the Junior TT aboard the Valmoto Triumph Daytona, giving Triumph its first TT win in 27 years. In the Production 600cc class, Anstey managed an 8th-place finish for Triumph and completed the racing programme with 7th place in the Senior aboard a 1000cc Suzuki.

2003 TT results

Suzuki (2004-2010)

2004
Signed by TAS Suzuki in 2004, Anstey's reputation for consistency saw him finish on the podium in all the races he entered at the TT. A 3rd place in the opening Formula 1 was followed by victory in the 1000cc Production race. A trio of 2nd-place finishes then followed as Anstey took the runner up spot in the Junior 600cc, the Production 600cc and the Senior TT respectively.

2004 TT results

2005 
Again Anstey was entered in five races at the 2005 Isle of Man TT, producing mixed results. Problems with his TAS Suzuki GSX-R1000 Superbike saw him retire in both races in which the machine featured. On the plus side Anstey took victory in the Superstock TT cementing his reputation in the class. Following this he took 4th place in the opening Supersport race but retired in the following one. Anstey's week ended with his retirement in Friday's Senior.

2005 TT results

2006
This speed value was registered by the on-board datalogging equipment and so cannot be considered as an official record.

2006 TT results

2007
At the Centenary TT of 2007, Anstey failed to finish in the opening Superbike Race, but swiftly made up for it by claiming victory in the Superstock event winning by 40 seconds over John McGuinness. Anstey missed out on a podium place in the Supersport race finishing 4th, which was followed by another retirement in the highlight Senior TT.

2007 TT results

2008
In 2008, Anstey opened his account by claiming the runner up spot in the Superbike race. This was followed by an initial victory in the opening Supersport only for Anstey to be subsequently stripped of the 1st place. Having defied a heavy cold to win the race, he was disqualified following an inspection of his machine, which found the exhaust cam did not meet regulations. However just two days later on Wednesday 4 June Anstey swept to victory in the second Supersport Junior race in which he was involved in a thrilling dice on corrected time with Ian Hutchinson. Following over 150 miles of racing, Anstey came home in a time of 1'13:35.71 at an average speed of 123.041 mph. On his second lap he also broke the lap record for the race with an average speed of 125.359 mph.
The Senior TT again proved a disappointment for Anstey, with him posting a retirement.

To celebrate his Supersport Junior TT win, Suzuki released a GSXR-600 K8 replica of Anstey's Relentless by TAS Suzuki race bike.

2008 TT results

2009
Anstey's campaign at the 2009 Isle of Man TT proved particularly frustrating. A 2nd place in the second Supersport race being the highlight with retirements in the other four races.

2009 TT results

2010
The 2010 meeting again provided a mixed bag of fortunes for Anstey. Finishing just outside the top 10 in the opening Superbike race, he failed to finish in either the opening Supersport or the Superstock races. An 8th place followed in the second Supersport race and, comparatively, the meeting ended on a positive note with Anstey securing the final place on the rostrum after a hard-fought Senior.

2010 TT results

Honda (2011-present)

2011
Anstey had switched teams for the 2011 season, and compared with the previous two seasons an upturn in fortune was evident. Although he failed to finish in the Superbike TT, he enjoyed a win in the opening Supersport race, followed by a further retirement in the Superstock. A 5th place in the second Supersport was followed by Anstey again taking 3rd in the finale race, the Senior TT.

2011 TT results

2012
At the 2012 Isle of Man TT Anstey took a well earned 3rd place in the Superbike race followed by victory in the opening Supersport race. A brace of 4th places followed in the Superstock and second Supersport races.

2012 TT results

2013
Anstey achieved a commendable list of results at the 2013 Races, where he secured an 8th place in the opening Superbike race, followed by taking second place on the podium in the first Supersport. A 5th place in the Superstock was followed by another 2nd in the second Supersport race. Anstey rounded off the week's racing with 3rd place in the Senior.

2013 TT results

2014
Anstey's renowned consistency was particularly evident at the 2014 TT. He posted a 4th place in the Superbike race, followed by 2nd in the Supersport and 3rd in the Superstock. The 2014 TT also saw Anstey's debut in the TT Zero Class in which he finished in 2nd place to John McGuinness on an identical Mugen Shinden San. Another 2nd place followed in the second of the Supersport events and the week was rounded off with 4th in the Senior.

In the Superbike TT, Anstey set a new outright lap record for the Mountain Course. In addition to his haul of six silver replicas, Anstey was also awarded the prestigious John Williams Trophy for the fastest lap in the Superbike TT Race and the Jimmy Simpson Trophy, which is presented to the rider who has achieved the fastest lap of the meeting.

2014 TT results

2015

Superbike TT
On Sunday 7 June 2015 Anstey achieved the highlight of his career, winning the Superbike TT.
Lying in second place behind race leader Ian Hutchinson Anstey took the race lead following the pit stops at the end of lap four. Astride a Padgett's Honda Anstey began to extend his lead, claiming victory by 10.97 seconds on corrected time following  of racing. Added to the victory, Anstey also set a new race record and the fastest lap of the race on his sixth lap at an average speed of 131.977 mph.

Following his success in the Superbike race Anstey also claimed the John Williams Trophy for the second year in succession.

Supersport (Race 1)
Anstey's 2015 campaign continued when he took a 2nd place behind the rejuvenated Hutchinson in the first of the Supersport races and followed this by finishing 9th in the Superstock.

TT Zero
Riding for the Mugen Shinden team, Anstey then competed in the TT Zero, his second year competing in the class, taking his electrically powered machine to second place behind Mugen teammate, John McGuinness.

Supersport (Race 2)
In the second Supersport race of the week Anstey continued his run of podium positions, again finishing 2nd to Ian Hutchinson.

Senior TT
The Senior TT was red flagged midway through lap 2, following an incident involving Jamie Hamilton. A restart followed with the race reduced to 4 laps. Anstey concluded a highly satisfactory week's racing by taking 8th place in the restarted race.

2015 TT results

2016
Remaining with Honda for 2016, it was announced that Anstey was to ride a Honda RC213V-S at the TT, specially prepared by the Valvoline Racing by Padgett's Motorcycles Team. Various adjustments had to be made to the machine in order for it to withstand six laps of the punishing 37.73 mile Snaefell Mountain Course with such parts as the wheels, the forks, the rear shocks, the brakes and the radiator guards all having to be specially made.

Anstey was enjoying a reasonably successful qualifying week until he came off his Honda Fireblade, CBR1000RR Superbike at Keppel Gate during qualifying on Thursday 2 June, as a result of which he received various injuries.

Superbike TT
After a check up at Noble's Hospital, Douglas, he was passed fit to compete in the opening Superbike race on Saturday 4 June. Despite his injuries, Anstey came home in a respectable 8th place on board the Honda RC213V-S.

Supersport (Race 1)
Still evidently feeling the effects of the injuries sustained during the Practice Week, Anstey managed to hold station within the top 10 for the first two laps of the opening Supersport 600 race. However, following the pit stops at the end of lap 2 he subsequently retired on lap 3 at Ballacraine.

Superstock TT
Later, on 6 June, Anstey lined up on the Glencrutchery Road for the afternoon race, the Superstock TT. Again riding in significant discomfort he retired at the TT Grandstand at the end of the opening lap.

Supersport (Race 2) & TT Zero

A rest day during race week combined with a spell at the Isle of Man's hyperbaric chamber paid dividends for Anstey. Notably improved form followed when he took 5th place in the Junior TT, followed by victory in the TT Zero, his first triumph in that particular category. Although trailing at Ballaugh Bridge to Mugen teammate John McGuinness, Anstey took the lead after McGuinness had stopped to make adjustments, leading home William Dunlop and Jamie Hamilton.

Senior TT
A further day's recuperation continued to aid Anstey prior to the Senior TT.
 With the retirement of Peter Hickman, Anstey moved up to 3rd place at the pit stop at the end of lap 2, until he was displaced by John McGuinness at the end of lap 3. Anstey was then overtaken on corrected time by Dean Harrison following the second round of pit stops at the end of lap 4, holding 5th place until the end of the 6 laps.

2016 TT results

2017

In addition to his participation in the main classes at the 2017 Isle of Man TT for Padgett's Honda, it was announced on May 23 that following the injuries sustained by John McGuinness at the North West 200, and his subsequent withdrawal from the TT, Anstey had renewed his association with the Mugen Team in order to compete in the TT Zero class taking the place vacated by McGuinness.

Poor weather blighted the qualifying week at the TT, with competitors completing only a fraction of the required laps.  A reshuffle of the race schedule was required with the first race day given over to qualifying and practice, meaning the traditional curtain raiser the Superbike TT moving to Sunday June 4.

Superbike TT
Anstey formed up on the Glencutchery Road with the Honda RC213V-S, having by the standards of the week, enjoyed a reasonable qualifying period. Anstey took the RC213V-S across the line in 8th place on corrected time at the end of lap 1 involving himself in a close tussle with Conor Cummins and Michael Rutter. By the pit stops at the end of the second lap Anstey had slipped to 10th position, however he had reclaimed 8th by the end of lap 3. During lap 4 Anstey was forced to stop at Ramsey Hairpin in order to inspect the rear of the machine following concern about the degradation of the tyre, and this saw him relegated to 13th place by the time he exited the pits at the end of the lap. Working his way ahead of Horst Saiger and Sam West during lap 5, Anstey began the final lap just outside the top 10, holding 11th place. However over the course of the final lap he was overtaken on corrected time by both Saiger and West and after  of racing he brought his machine home in 13th place.

Supersport (Race 1)
The first of the Supersport 600cc races was held on the afternoon of Monday June 5. Anstey made a steady start lying in 11th place by the end of the opening lap. Progress was made during lap 2 with Anstey edging into the top 10, having moved up to 9th place at the pit stops at the end of the lap. Continuing to work his way up the field, Anstey crossed the line in 7th place by the end of the third lap, managing to hold station until the end of the 4 lap race.

Superstock
Anstey suffered disappointment in the Superstock race, retiring at the pits at the end of the opening lap.

Supersport (Race 2)
Poor weather continued to plague the racing programme forcing the itinerary of the meeting to be rescheduled. As a consequence of inclement weather on Thursday June 8 the second Supersport 600cc race, the Junior TT, was cancelled.

TT Zero
Rescheduled for Friday June 9 and starting first on the road, Anstey lead the field for the one lap race from start to finish to claim his 12th TT win.

2017 TT results

North West 200 
Making his debut at the 2002 North West 200, Anstey has managed to chalk up ten victories between 2002 and 2017, making him sixth on the all-time winners list; his last victory being at the 2015 meeting.

2002 - 2003
His maiden victory came in 2002 when he won the Production race. Whilst featuring on the podium at the 2003 North West, Anstey failed to secure a win.

2004
Making his International Road Race debut for Suzuki in 2004, Anstey won the Supersport 600cc race in addition to the Production race. Making up for his 2003 disappointment, a hat-trick appeared to beckon with Anstey leading the Superbike race until the final lap when he crashed.

2005
At the 2005 North West 200 he won the rain affected Superbike event and finished runner-up to Ian Lougher in the Superstock race.

2006
At the 2006 meeting he won the first Supersport race and the Superstock race.

2007
The 2007 meeting proved to be his best year up to that date, winning a hat-trick of races that could have been more, had he not crashed out of the first Superbike event. While running in 2nd on the third lap, he "highsided" at York Corner, and he was placed 2nd in the results because they were taken from the last completed lap. He went on to win the two Supersport events, and the Superstock event as well. He may well have increased his tally, but was unable to race in the main Superbike event, as his bike was damaged from the previous crash.

2008
Relevant disappointment affected Anstey at the 2008 North West 200 Races; a 5th place in the first Superbike outing was followed by runner-up spot in the Superstock race and 4th in the second of the Superbike races.

2009
The 2009 North West 200 Races saw a return to the top of the podium for Anstey, with him claiming 1st spot in the opening Superbike race ahead of John McGuinness which was followed up by a 3rd and 4th place in the Superstock and Supersport races, respectively. A brace of runner-up places followed in the subsequent Supersport races.

2010
Opening his account with a 6th place in the first Superbike race in 2010, Anstey continued to suffer from misfortune in the subsequent races, posting a retirement in the opening Supersport 600cc race which was followed by a further retirement in the Superstock before recording 10th in the feature Superbike race and concluding the meeting with 3rd in his second Supersport outing.

2011
The 2011 North West 200 was blighted by misfortune including inclement weather, an oil spill and a hoax bomb alert. Only one race was able to run before the programme was curtailed and in which Anstey claimed 3rd place in a rain sodden Supersport 600cc race.

2012
Again the victim of inclement weather, the 2012 North West 200 saw further interruption to the racing programme. Anstey came home in 7th place in his first outing in the Supersport category, followed with a 6th place in the Superbike race.

2013
Having qualified strongly across the range of classes at the North West 200 in 2013, Anstey claimed 4th place in the opening Supersport race on Thursday May 16. However the weather was again the main talking point of the meeting, putting paid to the majority of the race schedule on Saturday May 18. This again saw Anstey take 4th spot in a rain blighted Supersport race.

2014
However this was his only positive in the meeting.

2015
The 2015 North West 200 Races again saw Anstey feature prominently in the opening race where he just missed out on a podium position, coming home in 4th position. An improvement followed in the feature Superbike race when he claimed the third tier behind Alastair Seeley and Ian Hutchinson.

2016
At the 2016 North West 200, Anstey made a good start from a middle grid position in the opening Superbike Race. Anstey continued to cement his position in the field when, towards the end of lap 4, he crashed his Honda Fireblade at Church Corner as a result of running a wider line. As a consequence of the crash the race was red flagged. This was the first time at the North West that Anstey failed to take a place on the podium.

2017
Anstey remained a member of the Pagett's Honda squad for the 2017 North West 200 races which saw him campaigning a Honda Fireblade in the Superbike category as well as a new Honda SP2 in the Superstock and a Honda CBR600RR in the Supersport race.
Starting from row four on the grid, Anstey finished in 12th place in the Supersport race.
Anstey's disappointing qualifying continued into the Superstock practice which saw him record a lowly 44th quickest time in the opening session followed by a failure to post a time in the second session and consequently he failed to start the race.

A more positive performance occurred in opening practice session for the Superbike class in which Anstey managed to qualify 15th fastest aboard the Honda Fireblade recording an impressive speed of  through the speed trap on the approach to University. In the second session Anstey managed to improve this by moving up to 11th quickest. Starting the race from 14th on the grid Anstey's disappointment continued as he was forced to retire at the end of lap 2.

Ulster Grand Prix 
Anstey has also claimed numerous successes at the Ulster Grand Prix, taking the top step on the podium on 13 occasions.

2003 - 2010
At the 2003 Ulster Grand Prix Anstey took his maiden victory, when he claimed the honors in the 1000cc Production Race. Building on his 2003 exploits, 2004 saw Anstey secure a hat-trick of successes in the Superbike, Production 600, and Production 1000 classes. Whilst failing to take the top spot in 2005, he did manage to secure 2 podiums. In 2006, he was victorious in the Superstock class once more. Further success belonged to Anstey at the 2010 meeting, securing another hat-trick to bring his winning tally to eight. This was Anstey's last appearance for TAS Suzuki and saw him sign off by obliterating the previous lap record, setting a new average lap speed of  making him then the fastest rider on the fastest motorcycle racing circuit in the world.

2011
Having signed for Padgett's Honda, Anstey took a solitary victory at the 2011 meeting taking the winner's garland in the Superspport 600cc class.

2012
Again a single victory was all Anstey was able to secure at the 2012 UGP when he again came home at the head of the field in one of the Supersport races.

2013
Whilst he failed to gain top spot on the podium at the 2013 Ulster Grand Prix, the meeting saw a return of the consistency of which Anstey is so renowned. Clinching the runner-up position in the opening Superbike race, this was followed by a brace of runner up positions in both Supersport outings and a third place in the Superstock. The signature race, the Ulster Grand Prix, saw Anstey come home in fourth place to conclude a very rewarding meeting.

2014
Anstey's campaign at the 2014 event saw him take the honors once more in the opening Supersport race. He then enjoyed further success when he went on to win the blue riband Superbike race. Anstey's brace of wins saw him named 'Man of the Meeting'.

2015
At the 2015 Ulster Grand Prix Anstey took the honours in the associated event, the Dundrod 150 as well as taking victory in the main event, in controversial circumstances. The feature event, the Ulster Grand Prix, was red flagged following an incident towards the end of lap 7. The race organisers decided to give the victory to Anstey, who had been leading at the end of lap 4, citing they could not take the standings after the fifth lap because some riders had not completed it when the red flags went up. Anstey secured victory over Ian Hutchinson who had been leading the race at the end of lap 5 (two-thirds distance).

2016
The 2016 Ulster Grand Prix was a meeting dominated by Ian Hutchinson, however Anstey also enjoyed a respectable meeting being reunited with the Honda RC213V-S. Having recovered from the injuries he sustained earlier in the season at the Isle of Man TT, Anstey took the runner up spot behind Hutchinson in both the Superbike races and victory in the opening (red flagged) Supersport event. Anstey concluded the meeting by taking 4th spot in the second Supersport race.

2017
Anstey's participation at the 2017 Ulster Grand Prix was confirmed in mid July. A press release from the Padgett's Honda Team confirmed  Anstey would campaign both a Honda RC213V-S and for the Classic Lightweight event, a Honda RS250.

Anstey enjoyed renewed success, with a first and second in two of the three Supersport 600 cc races. In his first outing Anstey took a 2nd aboard the Pagett's Honda behind Man of the Meeting, Peter Hickman.
Anstey fared less well when he retired the Padgett's Honda RS250R at the end of the opening lap due to mechanical problems. feature race
Anstey's luck returned for the Superbike feature race, which saw Anstey secure a maiden win in an International Road Race for the Honda RC213V-S. The race saw Anstey dicing at the head of the pack with up to five other riders in which lap records tumbled, and it finally came down to a two-way duel between Anstey and Hickman on the final lap. Taking the lead midway through the lap at Joey's Windmill, Anstey held on from Hickman to claim his first victory since 2015.
In his second outing in the Supersport 600 cc class Anstey finished  second behind Hickman, who claimed a popular hat-trick at the event.

Classic TT 
Following changes to the Manx Grand Prix Races in 2013, the Classic TT became part of the newly revamped festival allowing established TT competitors the opportunity to compete on classic and post-classic machinery.

2013
Anstey campaigned a classic bike at the 2013 Classic TT. He failed to finish in the Bennett's 500cc Classic on which he rode a 1961 Manx Norton.

2013 Classic TT results

2014
At the 2014 Manx Festival of Motorcycling, Anstey was entered in the 500cc Classic TT and Formula 1 Classic TT. Again on board the Manx Norton Anstey took 3rd in the 500cc Classic and notched up his maiden victory at the event when he took a Padgett's Yamaha YZR500 to 1st place in the Formula 1 Classic.

2014 Classic TT results

2015
Entering in the Motorsport Merchandise F1/F2 Classic TT, Anstey lined up astride the same Padgett's Yamaha YZR500 which he had taken to 1st place in the Formula 1 Classic the previous year. A strong depth of field joined Anstey on the grid as he went head to head with Michael Dunlop, Michael Rutter, Ryan Farquhar and Peter Hickman amongst others.

As a consequence of various delays during the course of the day, racing finally got underway at 5pm with Anstey's Yamaha YZR500 pitted against Suzuki, Kawasaki and Yamaha Superbikes. Tussling with the pugnacious Dunlop at the head of the field, Anstey crossed the line in 1st place at the end of the opening lap with a time of 18:13.707 producing an average speed of 124.190. As the second lap progressed Anstey began to secure the lead from Dunlop taking an increasing advantage into the 3rd lap. However Anstey was then black flagged as he approached Cronk-ny-Mona at the end of lap 3. The result of this being Anstey  having to return to the pits with a loose left exhaust.

The Valvoline Racing by Padgetts Motorcycles team battled to fix the problem and Anstey rejoined the race, but he'd lost a minute to Michael Dunlop, handing victory to Dunlop on a plate. Anstey had the consolation of clawing back a gap of over thirty seconds on James Hillier on the last lap and with Ryan Farquhar losing time on the Mountain section, Anstey snatched 2nd place by a second from Farquhar.

2015 Classic TT results

2016
Anstey enjoyed success in the Classic 250cc race, leading from start to finish. Campaigning a Padgett's Honda RS250R, he recorded a fastest lap of 118.74 mph breaking John McGuinness' lap record which had stood since 1999. Anstey is now the current lap record holder on the Snaefell Mountain Course in both two stroke categories, set at the Classic TT.

Anstey failed to make an impact in the Superbike Race. On board the Padgett's Yamaha YZR500 Anstey was lying in 8th place at the end of the opening lap behind a rampaging Michael Dunlop, who went on to break Anstey's lap record for the Superbike class (although Anstey's record for two stroke machinery still stands). Anstey made no impression at the head of the field, and retired on lap four at Glen Tramman.

2016 Classic TT results

2017
Anstey returned to the Isle of Man for the Classic TT Races in August, 2017. Practice saw him amongst the higher end of the field prior to his opening race, the Dunlop Classic Lightweight TT.

2017 Classic TT results

2019
Having recovered sufficiently from the effects of his cancer treatment, Anstey made a return to racing at the 2019 Classic TT in August. From the start of the four-lap post-classic 250 cc race, Anstey took the lead bringing his 250 cc Honda into first place by a margin of 70 seconds over his team mate, Davy Todd.

2019 Classic TT results

Personal life
Anstey tends to shy away from un-warranted media attention, although he is not averse to giving interviews. Together with his partner, Anny, he spends his time away from racing at his home in Cullybackey, County Antrim, having moved there from Windsor, or in New Zealand.

A popular joke amongst the motorcycle racing paddock surrounds Anstey's propensity for sleeping. It is often referred to that his racing results reflect which time the race occurs – the later in the day, the better.

Illness
Anstey's racing career suffered a setback in 1995 when he was diagnosed with testicular cancer. Having made his first appearance at the Isle of Man TT Races in 1996, he was forced to miss the 1997 meeting as a consequence of undergoing treatment. Although being declared free of the disease, he has stated that he still feels the lingering effects part of which affect his immune system.

In April 2018 it was revealed that Anstey needed treatment after several cancerous tumours had been found in his lungs and on his spine, in addition to a blood clot on one of his lungs, which ruled him out of racing for the 2018 season.

Anstey underwent an operation in 2019. In an interview with the BBC in September 2021 he stated that he believes the operation to have been successful, however he still has to undergo blood tests every three months.

Pre-ride rituals
On numerous occasions prior to races, a traditional New Zealand Haka has been performed for Anstey. He also received a Haka following his win at the 2015 Ulster Grand Prix.

Helmets
Anstey is contracted to the Arai Helmet Company, his current helmet design is the Arai RX7-RC.

Awards
In the 2015 New Year Honours, Anstey was appointed a Member of the New Zealand Order of Merit for services to motorsport.

Bruce was inducted into the Motorcycle NZ Hall of fame on 15 May 2021.

Nicknames
Anstey is widely recognized as one of the most laid-back racers in motorcycling and is known by at several nicknames; one being "Smiler," a name bestowed on him by members of his family, and used by motorcycle racing commentator Fred Clarke. Other nicknames by which Anstey is popularly known are "Bruce Almighty," "The Wellington Wonder" and "The Flying Kiwi."

Complete TT record

References

External links

1969 births
Sportspeople from Wellington City
Isle of Man TT riders
New Zealand motorcycle racers
Living people
Members of the New Zealand Order of Merit